Subak is the water management (irrigation) system for the paddy fields on Bali island, Indonesia. It was developed in the 9th century. For the Balinese, irrigation is not simply providing water for the plant's roots, but water is used to construct a complex, pulsed artificial ecosystem. The temples are the main focus of this cooperative water management, known as subak.

Religious relationship
Subak is a traditional ecologically sustainable irrigation system that binds Balinese agrarian society together within the village's Bale Banjar community center and Balinese temples. The water management is under the authority of the priests in water temples, who practice Tri Hita Karana Philosophy, a self-described relationship between humans, the earth and the gods. Tri Hita Karana draws together the realm of spirit, the human world and nature. The overall subak system exemplifies this philosophical principle.  Water temple rituals promote a harmonious relationship between people and their environment through the active engagement of people with ritual concepts that emphasize dependence on the life-sustaining forces of the natural world. Rice is seen as the gift of god, and the subak system is part of temple culture.

System
Subak components are the forests that protect the water supply, terraced paddy landscape, rice fields connected by a system of canals, tunnels and weirs, villages, and temples of varying size and importance that mark either the source of water or its passage through the temple on its way downhill to irrigate subak land.
Rice, the water required to grow rice, and subak, the cooperative canal system that controls the water, have together shaped the landscape over the past thousand years. Water from springs and canals flows through the temples and out onto the rice paddy field. In total, Bali has about 1,200 water collectives and between 50 and 400 farmers manage the water supply from one source of water. The property consists of five sites that exemplify the interconnected natural, religious, and cultural components of the traditional subak system.

The sites include: 
 the Supreme Water Temple of Pura Ulun Danu Batur on the edge of Mount Batur crater lake, (Lake Batur) is regarded as the ultimate origin of every spring and river; 
 the Subak landscape of the Pakerisan river watershed the oldest known irrigation system in Bali; 
 the Subak landscape of Catur Angga Batukaru with terraces mentioned in a 10th-century inscription making them amongst the oldest in Bali and prime examples of Classical Balinese temple architecture; and the Royal Water temple of Pura Taman Ayun, the largest and most architecturally distinguished regional water temple, exemplifying the fullest expansion of the subak system under the largest Bali Kingdom of the 17th century.

These architectural sites are inspired by several different ancient religious traditions, including Shaiva Siddhanta and Samkhyā Hinduism, Vajrayana Buddhism and Austronesian cosmology.

World Heritage Site status
On 6 July 2012, subak was enlisted as a UNESCO World Heritage Site. Cultural Landscape of Bali Province: the Subak System as a Manifestation of the Tri Hita Karana Philosophy, consist of Supreme Water Temple Pura Ulun Danu Batur and Lake Batur, Subak Landscape of Pakerisan Watershed, Subak Landscape of Catur Angga Baturkaru, and Royal Temple of Taman Ayun has been inscribed upon a World Heritage List of The Conservation concerning the protection of the World Cultural and Natural Heritage. Inscription on this list confirms the outstanding universal value of cultural or natural property which deserves protection for the benefit of all humanity.

Museum
In 1981, the Subak Museum opened in Tabanan Regency.

Gallery

See also

 List of Indonesian inventions and discoveries
 Anggabaya
 Bawdi
 Check dam
 Johad
 Stepwell
 Taanka
 Tabanan
 Rani ki vav
 History of stepwells in Gujarat

References

Further reading
J. Stephen Lansing, Priests and Programmers: Technology of Power in the Engineered Landscape of Bali Princeton University Press.
"Balinese Water Temples Withstand Tests of Time and Technology" – National Science Foundation
Simulation Modeling of Balinese Irrigation (extract) by J. Stephen Lansing (1996)
"The Impact of the Green Revolution and Capitalized Farming on the Balinese Water Temple System" by Jonathan Sepe (2000). Literature review.
Direct Water Democracy in Bali. 
Subak - A Sustainable System of Irrigation by Daniel Pratt (2016)

External links 
 Cultural Landscape of Bali Province: the Subak System as a Manifestation of the Tri Hita Karana Philosophy
  Pengakuan Subak Sebagai Warisan Budaya Dunia

World Heritage Sites in Indonesia
Agriculture in Indonesia
Indonesian culture
Natural history of Indonesia
Irrigation
Irrigation canals
Indonesia
Cultural Properties of Indonesia in Bali